Jamal Ahmed Abu Abed (born 19 January 1965) is a Jordanian professional football coach and former player who is the head coach of Jordanian club Al-Faisaly.

Career statistics

International

Honours

Player
Al-Faisaly
 Jordan League: 1983, 1985, 1986, 1988, 1989, 1990, 1992, 1993, 1999, 2000
 Jordan FA Cup: 1981, 1983, 1987, 1989, 1992, 1993, 1994, 1995, 1999
 Jordan Super Cup: 1982, 1984, 1986, 1987, 1991, 1993, 1994, 1995, 1996
 Jordan Shield Cup: 1987, 1991, 1992, 2000

Jordan
 Pan Arab Games: 1997, 1999
 Jordan International Tournament: 1992

Maneger 
Al-Faisaly
 Jordan League: 2022

References

External links
 
 
 

1965 births
Living people
Sportspeople from Amman
Jordanian footballers
Association football defenders
Al-Faisaly SC players
Jordanian Pro League players
Jordan international footballers
Jordanian football managers
Shabab Al-Ordon Club managers
Al-Jazeera (Jordan) managers
Al-Faisaly SC managers
Jordan national football team managers
Al-Salt SC managers
Jordanian Pro League managers